James Philip Arthur Taylor (born 19 January 2001) is an English cricketer. He made his first-class debut for Derbyshire against the West Indies on 11 August 2017 during their tour of England, taking the wicket of Kraigg Brathwaite. The younger brother of fellow Derbyshire player Tom Taylor, he is a product of the Derbyshire cricket academy. Taylor also played club cricket for Barlaston in the North Staffordshire and South Cheshire League during 2017, recording bowling figures of 6/4 in one innings. He signed a two-year professional contract with Derbyshire in September 2017.

He made his List A debut for Derbyshire against Australia A on 23 June 2019. He joined Surrey on a two-year contract at the conclusion of the 2019 season.  He made his Twenty20 debut on 28 August 2020, for Surrey in the 2020 t20 Blast.

References

External links
 

2001 births
Living people
English cricketers
Derbyshire cricketers
Surrey cricketers
Cricketers from Stoke-on-Trent